Gürkan Uygun (born 27 May 1974) is a Turkish actor of Georgian descent.

He joined theater in his high school years. He started his career as an amateur actor in 1990. Then he received training at the Dormen Theater. In 1996, he made his debut on television and starred in the series Tatlı Kaçıklar, Böyle Mi Olacaktı, Yedi Numara, Deli Yürek and Şapkadan Babam Çıktı. He is best known for his role as Memati Baş in the Kurtlar Vadisi TV series. For about 10 years, he played the character of Memati. In 2018, he began portraying Halil Halid in Payitaht: Abdülhamid series. He portrayed the role of Hasan Sabbah in famous Turkish series Uyanış: Büyük Selçuklu

Theatre 
 Testosteron : Andrzej Saramonowicz - Oyun Studios - 2013
 Timon of Athens : William Shakespeare - Oyun Studios - 2006
 Out of Order : Ray Cooney - Dormen Theatre - 1998
 Funny Money : Ray Cooney - Dormen Theatre - 1996
 The Sunshine Boys : Neil Simon - Dormen Theatre - 1994

Filmography

Film 
 Hoşçakal Yarın : 1998
 Fasulye : 1999 - Cengiz
 Günce : 2003 - Paper Collector
 Çarpışma : 2005
 Kurtlar Vadisi Irak : 2006 - Memati Baş
 Kurtlar Vadisi Filistin : 2011 - Memati Baş
 Hititya Mangala Çarkı : 2013
 Çanakkale: Yolun Sonu : 2013 - Onbaşı Muhsin
 Tamammıyız? : 2013 - İhsan's father
 Çakallarla Dans 3: Sıfır Sıkıntı : 2014
 Unutursam Fısılda : 2014
 Bana Masal Anlatma : 2015 - Jilet, Topal
 Bizans Oyunları : 2016 - Gazi Magosa
 Hep Yek : 2016 - Cevat
 Deliormanlı : 2016 - Tahsin Kara
 Somuncu Baba: Aşkın Sırrı : 2016 - Bayezid I
 Ankara Yazı Veda Mektubu : 2016
 Cep Herkülü: Naim Süleymanoğlu : 2019 - Özer Feyzioğlu

Television 
 Kaygısızlar - 1994
 Tatlı Kaçıklar - 1995
 Son Kumpanya - 1997
 Bir Demet Tiyatro
 Affet Bizi Hocam - 1998
 Böyle Mi Olacaktı - 1998
 Yılan Hikayesi - 1999
 Yedi Numara - 2000
 Aşkım Aşkım - 2001
 Deli Yürek - 2002 - Cihan
 Çiçek Taksi - 2002
 Şapkadan Babam Çıktı - 2003
 Kurtlar Vadisi - 2003–2005 - Memati Baş
 Kurtlar Vadisi Terör - 2007 - Memati Baş
 Kurtlar Vadisi Pusu - 2007–2012 - Memati Baş
 Halil İbrahim Sofrası- 2010 - Himself (guest appearance)
 Muhteşem Yüzyıl - 2013 - Mimar Sinan
 Hititya: Madalyonun Sırrı - 2013
 Kaçak - 2013–2015 - Serhat Hakeri
 Kehribar - 2016 - Orhan Yarımcalı
 Bu Şehir Arkandan Gelecek - 2017 - Şahin Vargı
 Mehmed: Bir Cihan Fatihi - 2018 - Delibaş
 Payitaht: Abdülhamid - 2018–2020 - Halil Halit Bey
 Ishq o'yinlari - 2020 - Iskandar
 Uyanış: Büyük Selçuklu - 2020–2021 - Hasan Sabbah
 Teşkilat - 2021–present - Efkar / Yıldırım

Music videos 
 Yıldız Tilbe - "Vazgeçtim"

Documentaries 
 Afife Jale - 1997

References

External links 
 

1974 births
Turkish people of Georgian descent
Turkish male stage actors
Turkish male film actors
Turkish male television actors
Male actors from Izmit
Living people